Dr Bidhan Chandra Roy   (1 July 1882 – 1 July 1962) was an Indian physician, educationist, and statesman who served as Chief Minister of West Bengal from 1948 until his death in 1962. Roy played a key role in the founding of several institutions and the cities Bidhannagar and Kalyani. In India, the National Doctors' Day is celebrated in his memory every year on the 1st of July. He was awarded the Bharat Ratna, India's highest civilian honour in 1961. 1st July is observed as "National Doctors Day" in India

Early life and education
Bidhan Chandra Roy was born on 1 July 1882 to a Bengali Kayastha family in Bankipore in Patna, where his father, Prakash Chandra Roy, was serving as an excise inspector. His mother, Aghorkamini Devi, was religious and a devoted social worker. Bidhan was the youngest of five siblings – he had 2 sisters, Susharbashini and Sarojini, and 2 brothers, Subodh and Sadhan. Bidhan's parents were ardent Brahmo Samajists.

Prakash Chandra was a descendant of the family of Maharaja Pradapaditya, the rebel Hindu king of Jessore, but did not inherit much wealth from his ancestors. He earned a moderate salary for most part of Bidhan's childhood, but he and Aghorkamini supported the education and upbringing of both their own children and a number of other poor children, mostly orphans. The spirit of 'give and take' was inculcated in Bidhan and his siblings at a young age. They were taught and encouraged to give away what was precious to them, freely and willingly.

Bidhan studied at Patna Collegiate School in 1897, and obtained his I.A. degree from Presidency College, Calcutta. He completed his undergraduate studies at Patna College, where he obtained a B.A. degree with honours in mathematics. After graduating with his bachelor's degree, he applied to undertake postgraduate studies at the Indian Institute of Engineering Science and Technology and at the Calcutta Medical College. His application was accepted by both institutions and he chose to attend the latter. Bidhan left Patna in June 1901 to study at the Calcutta Medical College. While at medical school, Bidhan came upon an inscription which read, "Whatever thy hands findeth to do, do it with thy might." These words became a lifelong source of inspiration for him.

Intending to enroll at St Bartholomew's Hospital to complete further studies in medicine, Bidhan left for Britain in February 1909 with 1200. The then dean of St. Bartholomew's Hospital was reluctant to accept an Asian student and rejected Bidhan's application. Roy submitted several additional applications till the dean, after 30 admission requests, admitted Bidhan. Bidhan completed his studies in two years and three months, and in May 1911 became a member of the Royal College of Physicians and a fellow of the Royal College of Surgeons simultaneously. He returned home in 1911.

Career

After his return, Roy joined the Provincial Health Service. He exhibited immense dedication and hard work, and would serve as a nurse when necessary. In his free time, he practised privately, charging a nominal fee. He taught at the Calcutta Medical College, and later at the Campbell Medical School (now NRS Medical College) and the Carmichael Medical College (now R.G. Kar Medical College). Roy served as the first president of Cardiological Society of India from 1948 to 1950.

Roy believed that swaraj (the call to action for India's freedom) would remain a dream unless the people were healthy and strong in mind and body. He made contributions to the organisation of medical education. He played an important role in the establishment of the Jadavpur T.B. Hospital, Chittaranjan Seva Sadan, Kamala Nehru Memorial Hospital, Victoria Institution (college), and Chittaranjan Cancer Hospital. In 1926, the Chittaranjan Seva Sadan for women and children was opened by Roy.

In 1942, Rangoon fell to the Japanese bombing and caused an exodus from Calcutta fearing a Japanese invasion. Roy was serving as the Vice-Chancellor of the University of Calcutta. He acquired air-raid shelters for schools and college students to have their classes in, and provided relief for students, teachers and employees alike. In recognition for his efforts, the Doctorate of Science was conferred upon him in 1944.

Roy was also Mahatma Gandhi's personal doctor and friend.

In 1925, Roy ran for elections from the Barrackpore Constituency as an independent candidate for the Bengal Legislative Council and defeated the "Grand Old Man of Bengal," Surendranath Banerjee. Though an independent, Roy voted with the Swaraj Party (the Parliamentary wing of the Congress in the 1920s). As early as 1925, Roy tabled a resolution recommending a study of the causes of pollution in Hoogly and suggested measures to prevent pollution in the future.

Roy was elected to the All India Congress Committee in 1928. Roy efficiently conducted the Civil Disobedience in Bengal in 1929 and prompted Pandit Motilal Nehru to nominate him Member of the Working Committee (CWC) in 1930. The CWC was declared an unlawful assembly and Roy along with other members of the committee were arrested on 26 August 1930 and detained at Alipore Central Jail.

During the Dandi March in 1931, many members of the Calcutta Corporation were imprisoned. Congress requested Roy to remain out of prison and discharge the duties of the Corporation. He served as the Alderman of the Corporation from 1930 to 1931 and as the Mayor of Calcutta from 1931 to 1933. Under him, the Corporation made leaps in the expansion of free education, free medical aid, better roads, improved lighting, and water supply. He was responsible for setting up a framework for dispensing grant-in-aid to hospitals and charitable dispensaries.

Post independence

The Congress Party proposed Roy's name for Chief Minister of Bengal. Roy wanted to devote himself to his profession. On Gandhiji's advice, however, Roy accepted the position and took office on 23 January 1948. Bengal at the time had been torn by communal violence, shortage of food, unemployment and a large flow of refugees in the wake of the creation of East Pakistan. Roy brought unity and discipline among the party ranks. He then systematically and calmly began to work on the immense task in front of him. Within three years law and order was returned to Bengal without compromising the dignity and status of his administration. He told the people:

The nation honoured Roy with the Bharat Ratna on 4 February 1961. On 1 July 1962, his 80th birthday, after treating his morning patients and discharging affairs of the State, he took a copy of the "Brahmo Geet" and sang a piece from it. 11 hours later Roy died. After he died, his house became a nursing home named after his mother, Aghorkamini Devi. He had also constituted a trust for his properties at Patna to carry out social service, with eminent nationalist Ganga Sharan Singh (Sinha) being its first trustee.

The B.C. Roy National Award was instituted in 1962 in Roy's memory and has been awarded annually since 1976. The award recognizes excellent contributions in the areas of medicine, politics, science, philosophy, literature and arts. The Dr. B. C. Roy Memorial Library and Reading Room for Children in the Children's Book Trust, New Delhi, was opened in 1967. Today, his private papers are part of the Archives at the Nehru Memorial Museum & Library, at Teen Murti House, Delhi.

References

1882 births
1962 deaths
Bengali Hindus
Medical College and Hospital, Kolkata alumni
Presidency University, Kolkata alumni
University of Calcutta alumni
Patna University alumni
Academic staff of the University of Calcutta
Indian city founders
Recipients of the Bharat Ratna
Brahmos
Medical College and Hospital, Kolkata
Chief Ministers of West Bengal
20th-century Indian medical doctors
Indian National Congress politicians from West Bengal
Fellows of the Royal College of Physicians
Fellows of the Royal Society
Fellows of the Royal College of Surgeons
Indian independence activists from Bengal
Politicians from Kolkata
People from Patna district
Vice Chancellors of the University of Calcutta
Prisoners and detainees of British India
Mayors of Kolkata
Chief ministers from Indian National Congress
Scientists from Kolkata
20th-century Indian politicians